Frank Bell may refer to:

 Frank Bell (RAF airman) (1897–1960), World War I flying ace
 Frank Bell (baseball) (1863–1891), Major League Baseball player in 1885 for the Brooklyn Grays
 Frank Bell (educator) (1916–1989), British ex-POW, educator and founder of the Bell Educational Trust
 Frank Bell (governor) (1840–1927), governor of Nevada, 1890–1891
 Frank Bell (radio pioneer) (1896–1987), New Zealand radio pioneer; nephew of Francis Bell (New Zealand politician)
 Frank J. Bell (1885–1957), American doctor and aviator
 Frank T. Bell (1883–1970), U.S. Commissioner of Fish and Fisheries (1933–1939)
 Frank McKelvey Bell, Canadian soldier and author

See also
 Francis Bell (disambiguation)
 J. Franklin Bell